Ralf Sturm (born 18 October 1968 in Cologne) is a German former professional footballer who played as a striker. He is the son of Hans Sturm.

References

External links
 

Living people
1968 births
German footballers
Association football midfielders
Germany under-21 international footballers
1. FC Köln players
1. FC Köln II players
Wuppertaler SV players
Rot-Weiß Oberhausen players
Bundesliga players
Footballers from Cologne
West German footballers